Kim Seung-Myung (born September 1, 1987) is a South Korean football player who plays as a midfielder for South Korean club that Thai Division 1 League side Krabi.

Club career
On 17 November 2009, Gangwon called him as extra order at 2010 K-League Draft. His first K-League match was against Ulsan Hyundai FC in Chuncheon that draw by 2-2 in home game by substitute on 7 August 2010.

References

External links
 K-League Player Record 

1987 births
Living people
Association football midfielders
South Korean footballers
South Korean expatriate footballers
Gangwon FC players
K League 1 players
K3 League players
Expatriate footballers in Thailand
South Korean expatriate sportspeople in Thailand
Kim Seung-myung